Indicator is the ninth studio album released by the group Deine Lakaien, released in 2010.

Track listing
 "One Night"
 "Who`ll Save Your World"
 "Gone"
 "Immigrant"
 "Blue Heart"
 "Europe"
 "Along Our Road"
 "Without Your Words"
 "Six O'Clock"
 "Go Away Bad Dreams"
 "On Your Stage Again"
 "The Old Man Is Dead"

References

2010 albums
Dark wave albums
Deine Lakaien albums
Experimental music albums
Ministry of Sound albums